Brazil–Canada relations are the diplomatic relations between the Federative Republic of Brazil and Canada, as well as economic, social and cultural ties. In 2016, approximately 36,000 people in Canada claim to be of Brazilian descent. It's also estimated that there are around 12,000 people in Brazil that are of Canadian descent. Both nations are members of the G20, Organization of American States, United Nations and the World Trade Organization.

History

In 1866, Canada opened a consulate in Rio de Janeiro. In 1876, during his second world tour, Emperor Pedro II of Brazil paid a visit to Canada and visited the Niagara Falls and various locations within Ontario. During World War II, both nations fought side by side during the Italian campaign. In 1941, Brazil opened an embassy in Ottawa and Canada opened an embassy in Rio de Janeiro in 1944.

In January 1998, Jean Chrétien became the first Canadian Prime Minister to visit Brazil. In 2001, the visit was reciprocated when Brazilian President Fernando Henrique Cardoso paid a visit to Canada. After the initial visits, there would be several other high-level visits and reunions between leaders of both nations. Since 1998, Canada and Mercosur (which includes Brazil) have been discussing and negotiating on a free trade agreement.

Among the central themes of the bilateral relationship between both nations are partnerships in education, science, agricultural policy, technology and innovation. Canada is the country that hosts the largest number of Brazilian students, mostly interested in studying English and French for short periods of time. Both nations are major global players in medium size airplanes with Brazil's Embraer and Canada's Bombardier.

Canada is the main destination for Brazilian investment abroad, with a stock of over US$20 billion, making Brazil the seventh largest source of foreign direct investment in the country. Brazilian investments are concentrated in the mining sector. Canadian investments in Brazil, in turn, reach around US$15 billion and cover areas such as civil engineering, technology and mining.

High-level visits

High-level visits from Brazil to Canada
 President Fernando Henrique Cardoso (2001)
 Foreign Minister Antonio Patriota (2012)

High-level visits from Canada to Brazil
 Prime Minister Jean Chrétien (1998)
 Prime Minister Paul Martin (2004)
 Governor General Michaëlle Jean (2007)
 Prime Minister Stephen Harper (2011)
 Governor General David Johnston (2012)
 Foreign Minister John Baird (2013)

Bilateral agreements
Both nations have signed a few agreements such an Agreement on Science, Technology and Innovation Cooperation (2008); Memorandum of Understanding on Sustainable Development in Minerals and Metals (2009); Agreement on Social Security (2011);  Memorandum of Understanding on International Development Cooperation Effectiveness (2011); Air Transport Agreement (2011) and an Agreement to explore possible avenues for cooperation in the use of outer space for peaceful purposes (2011).

Resident diplomatic missions
 Brazil has an embassy in Ottawa and consulates-general in Montreal, Toronto and Vancouver.
 Canada has an embassy in Brasília and consulates-general in Rio de Janeiro and São Paulo.

See also

 Brazilian Canadians
 Canadian Brazilians
 Embassy of Brazil in Ottawa

References

Further reading
 Almeida Nunes, Vanessa. "Entangled representations of Brazil and Canada: towards a decolonial intervention." (PhD dissertation, U of Manitoba, 2021) online.
 Barbosa, Rosana. Brazil and Canada: economic, political, and migratory ties, 1820s to 1970s (Lexington Books, 2016) online.
 Braz, Albert. “Bahai Cuisine and Other Delicacies: Canadian-Brazilian Cultural Encounters and the Invisible Neighbour.” Canada and Beyond: A Journal of Canadian Literary and Cultural Studies, vol. 6, (2017), pp. 23-33.

 Brydon, Diana. “Canada and Brazil: Shifting Contexts for Knowledge Production.” Interfaces Brasil/Canadá 13#16 (2013), pp. 201-221.
 Brydon, Diana, and Vanessa Nunes. "Introduction. Canada, Brazil, and Beyond: extending the dialogue." Canada and Beyond: A Journal of Canadian Literary and Cultural Studies 6.1 (2017) online.

 Hewitt, W. E. "Elusive partners: defining Canada's relationship with Brazil in the 21st century." International Journal of Diplomacy and Economy 5.1 (2019): 78-92.
 Hewitt, W.E. Ted, and Inês C. Gomes. "'Matando o Desconhecimento': The Role of Culture in Brazil's Relations with Canada and Beyond." Canada and Beyond: A Journal of Canadian Literary and Cultural Studies 6.1 (2017) pp 9-21.online

 Hewitt, W. E. "National interests and the impact of student mobility: the case of Canada and Brazil." Revista Brasileira de Política Internacional 63 (2020) online.
 Hewitt, W. E. “Brazilian Studies in Canada: Dawn of a New Era?” Interthesis (2006), pp. 1-15.

 Jacobson-Konefall, Jessica. "'It's some cannibal thing': Canada and Brazil in Margaret Atwood's MaddAddam Trilogy.” Canada and Beyond: A Journal of Canadian Literary and Cultural Studies, vol. 6, (2017), pp. 57-65.

 Joseph, Janelle. “The Transculturation of Capoeira: Brazilian, Canadian, and Caribbean Interpretations of an Afro-Brazilian martial Art.” in Latin American Identities After 1980, edited by Gordana Yovanovich and Amy Huras, (Wilfrid Laurier UP, 2010), pp. 197-215.

 Raynor, Cecily. "Representations of Home in Obasan and Nihonjin: The Issei, Nisei, Sansei of Canada and Brazil." Canada and Beyond: A Journal of Canadian Literary and Cultural Studies, vol. 6, (2017), pp. 35-45.
 Sperling, Magali. “Jan Conn's encounters in Brazil: an-other writing.” Interfaces Brasil/Canadá, 5#1 (2005), pp. 97-113.

 Sperling, Magali. "Re-mapping historical silences: a discussion of Jan Conn's travel encounters in the Americas" Interfaces Brasil/Canadá 11#1 (2011), pp. 121-138.

 Zucchi, John. Mad Flight?: The Quebec Emigration to the Coffee Plantations of Brazil (McGill-Queen's Press-MQUP, 2018).

 
Canada
Brazil